ArtPrize is an art competition and festival in Grand Rapids, Michigan. Anyone over the age of 18 can display their art, and any space within the three-square-mile ArtPrize district can be a venue. There are typically over 160 venues such as museums, galleries, bars, restaurants, hotels, public parks, bridges, laundromats, auto body shops, and more.

ArtPrize lasts for 19 days beginning in late September, and during each festival $500,000 in cash prizes are awarded based on public voting and a jury of art experts. ArtPrize was originally an annual event; in 2018, it was switched to a biennial schedule.

ArtPrize was created in 2009 by Rick DeVos, the son of Republican gubernatorial candidate Dick DeVos and United States Secretary of Education Betsy DeVos. The DeVos family contributes approximately $560,000 annually to the ArtPrize budget. In 2017, the festival's connection to the DeVos family's wealth and their conservative politics was criticized by artist Eric Millikin in his “Made of Money” installation, placed within ArtPrize.

In 2014, The Art Newspaper listed ArtPrize as one of the most-attended "big ticket" art events (those where visitors are often counted more than once), with ArtPrize's attendance of 440,000 being roughly one quarter of the 1.6 million who attended the Russian Imperial Costume exhibition at the State Hermitage Museum in Saint Petersburg. ArtPrize was highlighted along with Slows Bar BQ and the Frederik Meijer Gardens & Sculpture Park as one of the reasons to visit Grand Rapids in The New York Times’ "52 Places To Go in 2016."

In 2018, ArtPrize announced the Project exhibition to showcase larger works and planned to hold ArtPrize every other year, though the Project 1 event in 2019 experienced substantially less visitors. The twelfth ArtPrize was postponed in 2020 with officials citing the COVID-19 pandemic. The 2022 event ran from September 15 to October 2, 2022, with many visitors criticizing the smaller scale of works present.

Concept

ArtPrize was conceived by Rick DeVos as an untraditional art contest with its goals being: any artist in the world could compete; anyone with property in downtown Grand Rapids could turn their space into a venue; and any visitor could vote for their favorite artwork. Event organizers would provide no selection committees or curators. And the largest cash prize in the art world would be awarded entirely by popular vote.

At the inaugural ArtPrize, held in 2009, the winners were determined solely by the public, voting from mobile devices and the ArtPrize website.  In 2010, ArtPrize added categories judged by art experts, and in 2014 restructured the awards format bringing two parallel tracks of public vote and juried awards with equal prize amounts. The updated award structure includes two Grand Prizes of $200,000, one chosen by public vote and one selected by a panel of three arts experts. An additional $100,000 in awards are given to artists in four entry categories—Two-Dimensional, Three-Dimensional, Time-Based, and Installation—as well as the Outstanding Venue Juried Award for best curatorial presentation.

Visitors must attend the annual event in person in order to vote. They can either download the ArtPrize mobile app, free for iOS and Android devices, which uses location services to determine when a visitor has stepped into the three square-mile event district—or visit an ArtPrize HUB location to register in person. Each artist is assigned a 5-digit vote code which is posted near their entry during the event, and available both online and in the mobile app.

2009 competition
The 2009 exhibition occurred in a  area of downtown Grand Rapids, from September 21 to October 9, 2009. 1,262 artists or artist collaboratives displayed their work in 159 venues. An estimated 200,000 attendees visited the event, with 334,219 total votes cast throughout the 19 days.

Participation 
ArtPrize 2009 official participation numbers:
 1,262 artist entries
 159 venues
 37,264 registered voters
 334,219 total votes cast
 200,000 (est.) visitors to Grand Rapids, Michigan

Public Vote Awards
The 2009 prizes, totaling to $449,000, were:
 1st place: $250,000
 2nd: $100,000
 3rd: $50,000
 4th through 10th: $7,000 each

Public Vote Top 10
On October 1, the top 10 entries were announced, and their ranking was announced October 8:
 Open Water no.24 - Ran Ortner (displayed at The Old Federal Building)
 Imagine That! - Tracy Van Duinen (displayed at the Grand Rapids Children's Museum)
 Portraits - Eric Daigh (displayed at The Old Federal Building)
 The Grand Dance - David Lubbers (displayed on the Grand River near the Blue Bridge)
 Moose - Bill Secunda (displayed at The B.O.B.)
 Nessie on the Grand - The Nessie Project (displayed on the Grand River near the Blue Bridge)
 Field of Reeds - John Douglas Powers (displayed at The Old Federal Building)
 The Furniture City Sets the Table for the World of Art - Sarah Grant (displayed on the Blue Bridge)
 Ecstasy of The Scarlet Empress - Jason Hackenwerth (displayed at the Urban Institute for Contemporary Arts (UICA))
 winddancer 2 - Michael Westra (displayed on the Blue Bridge)

Surprise Awards
Two previously unannounced awards were handed out:
 Curators Choice Award ($5000): salt & earth - Young Kim, Winston-Salem, N.C.
 Sustainability Award ($2500): The Image Mill: Sustainable Cinema #1 by Scott Hessels

2010 competition
The 2010 event took place from September 22 to October 10. The event introduced "Exhibition Centers," local cultural institutions featuring professional curation. Each ArtPrize Exhibition Center was required to host voter registration/activation as well as a retail presence. ArtPrize sought to have at least one Exhibition Center in each downtown Grand Rapids neighborhood.

Participation

ArtPrize 2010 official participation numbers:

 1,713 artist entries
 193 venues
 21 countries and 44 U.S. states
 44,912 registered voters
 465,538 votes cast
 250,000 (est.) visitors to Grand Rapids, Michigan

Public Vote Awards
The 2010 prizes, which were decided by public vote, totaled $449,000, were:
 1st place: $250,000
 2nd: $100,000
 3rd: $50,000
 4th through 10th: $7,000 each

Public Vote Top 10
On September 30, the 2010 Top 10 entries were announced, and their rankings were revealed during the Winners Announcement on October 7:

 Cavalry, American Officers, 1921 - Chris LaPorte, Grand Rapids, Michigan
 Svelata - Mia Tavonatti, Santa Ana, California
 Lure/Wave, Grand Rapids - Beili Liu, Austin, Texas
 A Matter Of Time - Paul Baliker, Palm Coast, Florida
 Vision - David Spriggs, Montreal, Quebec, Canada
 Helping mom one penny at a time - Wander Martich, Grand Rapids, Michigan
 Dancing With Lions - Bill Secunda, Butler, Pennsylvania
 salt & earth (garden for Patricia) - Young Kim, Winston-Salem, North Carolina
 SteamPig - The Steam Pig Experiment Birks, Jensen, Grand Rapids, Michigan
 Elephant Walk - Fredrick Prescott, Santa Fe, New Mexico

Juried Awards
Event organizers announced the addition of four juried awards for ArtPrize 2010. Event organizers noted that, depending on sponsor availability, more juried awards might be added to the program.

Categories and winners
 Two-Dimensional: Garden Party, Chez Hatfield - Andrew Lewis Doak and Adrian Clark Hatfield, Royal Oak, Michigan
 Three-Dimensional: XLoungeSeries - Mark Wentzel, Atlanta, Georgia
 Time/Performance: The Jettisoned - Yoni Goldstein, Chicago, Illinois 
 Urban Space: Plan B - Rick and Rose Beerhorst, Andre Beaumont and Mike Hoyte, Grand Rapids, Michigan
 International: Evaporative Buildings - Alex Schweder La, Berlin, Germany / New York, New York 
 Sustainability: A Matter Of Time - Paul Baliker, Palm Coast, Florida

Jurors

2011 competition
The 2011 event ran from September 21 to October 9. The biggest change to the competition was  the addition of an exhibition center dedicated to performance art—St. Cecilia Music Society. The organization was also the recipient of a $100,000 Our Town grant from the National Endowment for the Arts.

Participation

ArtPrize 2011 official participation numbers:

 1,582  artist entries
 164 venues
 39 countries and 43 U.S. states
 38,811 registered voters
 383,106 votes placed
 322,000 visitors to Grand Rapids, Michigan

Public Vote Awards
The 2011 prizes, which were decided by public vote, totaled $449,000, were:
 1st place: $250,000
 2nd: $100,000
 3rd: $50,000
 4th through 10th: $7,000 each

Public Vote Top 10
On September 30, the 2010 Top 10 entries were announced, and their rankings were revealed during the Winners Announcement on October 6:

 Crucifixion - Mia Tavonatti, Santa Ana, California
 The Metaphorist Project - Tracy Van Duinen, Chicago, Illinois
 Rain - Lynda Cole, Ann Arbor, Michigan
 President Gerald Ford Visits ArtPrize - Sunti Pichetchaiyakul, Thailand and Montana
 Rusty: A Sense of Direction/Self Portrait - Ritch Branstrom, Rapid River, Michigan
 Grizzlies on the Ford - Llew “Doc” Tilma, Wayland, Michigan
 The Tempest II - Laura Alexander, Columbus, Ohio
 Ocean Exodus - Paul Baliker, Palm Coast, Florida
 Under Construction - Robert Shangle, Grand Rapids, Michigan
 Mantis Dreaming" - Bill Secunda, Butler, Pennsylvania

Juried Awards
In addition to awards distributed as a result of a public vote, the organization distributed seven juried awards for ArtPrize 2011. An award dedicated to an outstanding venue was added in 2011. Each juried award winner received $7,000.

Categories and winners
 Two-Dimensional: One Ordinary Day of an Ordinary Town - Mimi Kato, St. Louis, Missouri
 Three-Dimensional: Nature Preserve - Michelle Brody, New York, New York
 Time/Performance: Remember:Replay:Repeat - Caroline Young, Chicago, Illinois 
 Urban Space: Salvaged Landscape - Catie Newell, Detroit, Michigan
 International: DISAPPEARANCES - an eternal journey - Shinji Turner-Yamamoto, Cincinnati, Ohio 
 Venue: SiTE:LAB - Curator: Paul Amenta, Grand Rapids, Michigan
 Sustainability: Walking Home: stories from the desert to the Great Lakes - Laura Milkins, Tucson, Arizona
 Ox-Bow Residency: Progressive Movement(s) - Evertt Beidler, Portland, Oregon

Jurors

2012 competition
The 2012 ArtPrize competition ran from September 19 to October 7. The event introduced new changes to the ArtPrize Juried Awards program, including category prizes valued at $20,000 (up from $7,000) and a first-ever $100,000 Juried Grand Prize, decided by panel of three art experts.

Participation
ArtPrize 2012 official participation numbers:

 1,517 artist entries
 161 venues
 46 countries 41 U.S. states and territories
 47,160 voters
 412,560 votes placed
 375,000 (est.) visitors to Grand Rapids in 19 days

Public Vote Awards
The 2012 prizes, which were decided by public vote, totaled $360,000, were:
 1st place: $200,000
 2nd: $75,000
 3rd: $50,000
 4th through 10th: $5,000 each

Public Vote Top 10
The top 10 entries were determined by a record 412,560 votes, and announced on October 10.
 Elephants - Adonna Khare, Burbank, Calif.
 Song of Lift - Martijn van Wagtendonk, Colbert, Ga.
 Rebirth of Spring - Frits Hoendervanger, Detroit, Mich.
 Stick-to-it-ive-ness: Unwavering pertinacity; perseverance - Richard Morse, Fennville, Mich.
 Lights in the Night - Mark Carpenter and Dan Johnson, Grand Rapids, Mich.
 Life in Wood - Dan Heffron, Traverse City, Mich.
 Origami - Kumi Yamashita, Brooklyn, N.Y.
 The Chase - Artistry of Wildlife, Marlette, Mich.
 Return to Eden - Sandra Bryant, Lynden, Wa.
 City Band - Chris LaPorte, Grand Rapids, Mich.

Juried Awards 
In addition to awards distributed as a result of a public vote, the organization distributed seven juried awards, totaling $200,000, during ArtPrize 2012 in five categories and a juried grand prize. Each category winner received $20,000. The Juried Grand Prize winner was awarded $100,000. The award was decided by a three-member jury panel.

Juried Grand Prize winner
 Displacement (13208 Klinger St.) - Design 99, Detroit, Mich

Category Award winners
 Two-Dimensional: Habitat - Alois Kronschlaeger, Brooklyn, N.Y.
 Three-Dimensional: More or Less - ABCD 83, Chicago, Ill.
 Time/Performance: Three Phases - Complex Movements, Detroit, Mich. 
 Urban Space: Flight - Dale Rogers, Haverhill, Ma.
 Venue: SiTE:LAB - Curator: Paul Amenta, Grand Rapids, Mich.
 Ox-Bow Residency: Collective Cover Project - Ann Morton, Phoenix, Ariz.

Jurors

2013 competition
The 2013 ArtPrize competition ran from September 18 to October 6.

Participation
ArtPrize 2013 official participation numbers:

 1,805 artist entries
 169 venues
 47 countries and 45 U.S. states and territories
 49,000 voters
 446,850 votes cast
 400,000 (est.) visitors to Grand Rapids, Michigan

Public Vote Awards
The 2013 prizes, which were decided by public vote, totaled $360,000, were:
 1st place: $200,000
 2nd: $75,000
 3rd: $50,000
 4th through 10th: $5,000 each

Public Vote Top 10
The top 10 entries were determined by a record 446,850 votes, and announced on October 4.
 Sleeping Bear Dune Lakeshore - Ann Loveless, Frankfort, Mich.
 Polar Expressed - Anni Crouter, Flint, Mich.
 UPlifting - Andy Sacksteder, Port Clinton, Ohio
 Dancing With Mother Nature - Paul Baliker, Palm Coast, Fla.
 Botanical Exotica a Monumental Collection of the Rare beautiful - Jason Gamrath, Seattle, Wash.
 Earth Giant -  Benjamin Gazsi, Morgantown, W.V.
 Myth-or-Logic - Robin Protz, New Hartford, Conn.
 Finding Beauty in Bad Things: Porcelain Vine - Fraser Smith, St Pete Beach, Fla.
 Taking Flight - Michael Gard, San Francisco, Calif.
 Tired Pandas - Nick Jakubiak, Battle Creek, Mich.

Juried awards
In addition to awards distributed as a result of a public vote, the organization distributed seven juried awards, totaling $200,000, during ArtPrize 2013 in five categories and a juried grand prize. Each category winner received $20,000. The Juried Grand Prize winner was awarded $100,000. The award was decided by a three-member jury panel.

Juried Grand Prize winner
 Ecosystem - Carlos Bunga, Barcelona, Spain

Category Winners
 Two-Dimensional: Europa and the Flying Fish - Kyle Staver, New York, N.Y.
 Three-Dimensional: Through the Skies for You - Kevin Cooley / Phillip Andrew Lewis, Chattanooga, Tenn.
 Time/Performance: The Last Post - Shahzia Sikander, New York, N.Y. 
 Urban Space: united.states : an everydaypeople project - J.D. Urban, Brooklyn, N.Y.
 Venue: The Fed Galleries @ KCAD, Kendall College of Art and Design - Curator: Michele Bosak, Grand Rapids, Mich.
 Ox-Bow Residency: Erase - Greg Bokor, Beverly, Mass.

Jurors

Controversy
David Dodde's Fleurs et riviere was an entry that placed magnetic flowers on the Alexander Calder sculpture La Grande Vitesse. After getting complaints, the City of Grand Rapids contacted the Calder Foundation to get their input. Calder's grandson, Alexander S. C. Rower, replied: "The initiative is luckily temporary and reflects an utter lack of understanding and respect of Calder's genius." The city decided to have the flowers removed before the end of the exhibition.

2014 competition
The 2014 ArtPrize competition ran from September 24 to October 12.

Participation 
ArtPrize 2014 official participation numbers:

 1,536 artist entries
 174 venues
 41,956 voters
 398,714 votes placed
 441,000+ (est.) visitors to Grand Rapids, Michigan

Public Vote Awards
The public vote determined three $20,000 category winners and a $200,000 grand prize winner. The grand prize winner does not receive $20,000 for their category win.

Public Vote Grand Prize winner
 Intersections - Anila Quayyum Agha, Indianapolis, Indiana

Category Award winners
 Two-Dimensional: Outcry - Gretchyn Lauer, Grand Rapids, Michigan
 Three-Dimensional: Reciprocity - Marc Sijan, Milwaukee, Wisconsin
 Time-Based: Your Move? - Robert Shangle, Sparta, Michigan
 Installation: Intersections - Anila Quayyum Agha, Indianapolis, Indiana

Juried Awards 
The jury awarded five $20,000 category winners and a $200,000 grand prize winner. There was a tie for the grand prize, so each winner received $100,000.

Juried Grand Prize winners
A first in ArtPrize history, the Grand Prize Jury recognized two outstanding works—splitting the $200,000 Juried Grand Prize.
 Intersections - Anila Quayyum Agha, Indianapolis, Indiana
 The Hair Craft Project - Sonya Clark, Richmond, Virginia
This is also the first time the opinions of both the voting public and the jury of art experts converged, awarding a top prize to one piece -- Intersections by Anila Quayyum Agha.

Category Award winners
 Two-Dimensional: The Hair Craft Project - Sonya Clark, Richmond, Virginia
 Three-Dimensional: Tengo Hambre - Maximo Gonzalez, Mexico City, Mexico
 Time-Based: respirador (breather) - Dance in the Annex, Grand Rapids, Michigan 
 Installation: Symptomatic Constant - Julie Schenkelberg, Brooklyn, New York
 Outstanding venue: SiTE:LAB @ The Morton, - Curator: Paul Amenta, Grand Rapids, Michigan

Jurors

2015 competition
The 2015 ArtPrize (also known as ArtPrize Seven) competition ran from September 23 to October 11.

Participation
ArtPrize 2015 official participation numbers:

 1,649 artist entries
 162 venues
 35,481 registered voters
 422,763 votes cast
 438,000+ (est.) visitors to Grand Rapids, Michigan

Public Vote Awards
The public vote determined three $12,500 category winners and a $200,000 grand prize winner. The grand prize winner does not receive $12,500 for their category win.

Public Vote Grand Prize winner
 Northwood Awakening - Loveless Photofiber, Frankfort, Michigan

Category Award winners
 Two-Dimensional: Northwood Awakening - Loveless Photofiber, Frankfort, Michigan
 Three-Dimensional: Greatest Generation/Beta Team/November - Fred Cogelow, Wilmar, Minnesota
 Time-Based: Whisper - Emily Kennerk, Zionsville, Indiana
 Installation: REACH and SPLASH - Andy Sacksteder, Gladstone, Michigan

Juried Awards
The jury awarded five $12,500 category winners and a $200,000 grand prize winner.

Juried Grand Prize winner
 Higher Ground - Kate Gilmore, Queens, New York

Category Award winners
The category winners were:
 Two-Dimensional: The Fearless Brother Project Presents - Monroe O'Bryant, Kentwood, Michigan
 Three-Dimensional: The Last Supper - Julie Green, Corvallis, Oregon
 Time-Based: That Was Then - Prince Thomas,  Houston, Texas
 Installation: In Our Element - Ruben Ubiera, Miami, Florida
 Outstanding venue: SiTE:LAB @ The Rumsey Street Project, - Curator: Paul Amenta, Grand Rapids, Michigan

Jurors
The jurors were:

2016 Competition 
The 2016 ArtPrize competition, also known as ArtPrize Eight, took place from September 21 to October 9.

Participation 
 1,453 artist entries
 170 venues
 37,433 registered voters
 380,119 votes cast
 507,000+ (est.) visitors to Grand Rapids, Michigan

Public Vote Awards 
The public vote determined three $12,500 category winners and a $200,000 grand prize winner. The grand prize winner does not receive $12,500 for their category win.

Public Vote Grand Prize Winner 
Wounded Warrior Dogs - James Mellick, Milford Center, Ohio

Category Award Winners 
 Two-Dimensional: Portraits of Light and Shadow - Joao Paulo Goncalves, Pompano Beach, Florida
 Three-Dimensional: Wounded Warrior Dogs - James Mellick, Milford Center, Ohio
 Installation: The Butterfly Effect - Allison Leigh Smith and Bryce Pettit, Durango, Colorado
 Time-Based: Sweeper's Clock - Maarten Baas, Den Bosch, North Brabant, Netherlands

Juried Awards 
The jury awarded five $12,500 category winners and a $200,000 grand prize winner.

Juried Grand Prize Winner 
The Bureau of Personal Belonging - Stacey Kirby, Durham, North Carolina

Category Award Winners 
 Two-Dimensional: les bêtes - Isaac Aoki, Grand Rapids, Michigan
 Three-Dimensional: Excavations - William Lamson, New York, New York
 Installation: This Space is Not Abandoned - 912 CollABORATIVE, Grand Rapids, Michigan
 Time-Based: Search Engine Vision “ISIS” - Eric Souther, Mishawaka, Indiana
 Outstanding Venue: Split between EVERYTHING IS TRANSFORMED, SiTE:LAB / Rumsey St. Project and This Space is Not Abandoned, 912 Grandville Avenue.

Jurors 
The ArtPrize Eight jurors included:

2017 Competition 
The 2017 ArtPrize competition, also known as ArtPrize Nine, took place from September 20 to October 8.

Participation 
1,346 artist entries
 175 venues
 43,010 registered voters
 384,053 votes cast
522,000+ (est.) visitors to Grand Rapids, Michigan

Public Vote Awards 
The public vote determined three $12,500 category winners and a $200,000 grand prize winner. The grand prize winner does not receive $12,500 for their category win.

Public Vote Grand Prize Winner 
A. Lincoln - Richard Schlatter, Battle Creek, Michigan

Category Award Winners 
 Two-Dimensional: A. Lincoln - Richard Schlatter, Battle Creek, Michigan
 Three-Dimensional: Lux Maximus Fused Glass, Copper, Bronze and Metal - Daniel Oropeza, Costa Mesa, California
 Installation: Oil + Water - Ryan Spencer Reed, Ludington, Michigan; Richard App, Grand Rapids, Michigan
 Time-Based: Red Dirt Rug Monument - Rena Detrixe, Tulsa, Oklahoma

Juried Awards 
The jury awarded five $12,500 category winners and a $200,000 grand prize winner.

Juried Grand Prize Winner 
The Heartside Community Meal - Seitu Jones, St. Paul, Minnesota

Category Award Winners 
 Two-Dimensional: Sofía Draws Every Day: Years 2, 3, and 4 - Sofía Ramírez Hernández, Grand Rapids, Michigan
 Three-Dimensional: Flint - Ti-Rock Moore, New Orleans, Louisiana
 Installation: Society of 23's Locker Dressing Room - Jeffrey Augustine Songco, Grand Rapids, Michigan
 Time-Based: Red Dirt Rug Monument - Rena Detrixhe, Tulsa, Oklahoma
 Outstanding Venue: The Fed Galleries @ KCAD, Kendall College of Art and Design - Curator: Michele Bosak, Grand Rapids, Mich.

Jurors 

The ArtPrize Nine jurors included:

2018 Competition 
The 2018 ArtPrize competition, also known as ArtPrize 10, ran from September 19 to October 7.

Important Dates

2019 Project 1 
For 2019, ArtPrize began its "Project" exhibition series, with Project 1 running from September 7 to October 27. The concept was to alternate between ArtPrize and the Project series every year. While ArtPrize organizers described Project 1 as a success, crowds were much smaller and visitors criticized the event as being less festive. As Project 1 was concluding, the executive director of ArtPrize, Jori Bennett, announced that she would step down.

References

External links

 Official Website
 ArtPrize on Facebook
 ArtPrize on Twitter
 ArtPrize on Instagram

Visual arts awards
Grand Rapids metropolitan area
Arts awards in the United States
Awards established in 2009
Recurring events established in 2009
Postmodernism
 
Tourist attractions in Grand Rapids, Michigan
Festivals in Michigan